Byesville  is a village in Guernsey County, Ohio, United States, along Wills Creek. The population was 2,438 at the 2010 census.

History
Byesville was platted in 1856, and named for Jonathan Bye, the owner of a local mill.  The village was incorporated in 1881.

Geography
Byesville is located at  (39.968985, -81.541087).

Byesville is drained by Wills Creek.

The village is crossed by Interstate 77, Ohio State Route 209, Ohio State Route 821 and Interstate 70, about two miles north of the village.

Demographics

2010 census
As of the census of 2010, there were 2,438 people, 1,027 households, and 673 families living in the village. The racial makeup of the village was 98.2% White, 0.1% African American, 0.2% Native American, 0.2% Asian, and 1.2% from two or more races. Hispanic or Latino of any race were 0.2% of the population.

There were 1,027 households, of which 32.2% had children under the age of 18 living with them, 43.6% were married couples living together, 17.0% had a female householder with no husband present, 4.9% had a male householder with no wife present, and 34.5% were non-families. 31.3% of all households were made up of individuals, and 15% had someone living alone who was 65 years of age or older. The average household size was 2.37 and the average family size was 2.95.

The median age in the village was 39.2 years. 25.4% of residents were under the age of 18; 8.4% were between the ages of 18 and 24; 22.9% were from 25 to 44; 26.9% were from 45 to 64; and 16.2% were 65 years of age or older. The gender makeup of the village was 46.6% male and 53.4% female.

2000 census
As of the census of 2000, there were 2,574 people, 1,064 households, and 706 families living in the village. The population density was 2,642.6 people per square mile (1,024.6/km2). There were 1,139 housing units at an average density of 1,169.4 per square mile (453.4/km2). The racial makeup of the village was 98.06% White, 0.19% African American, 0.43% Native American, 0.23% Asian, 0.04% Pacific Islander, and 1.05% from two or more races. Hispanic or Latino of any race were 0.66% of the population.

There were 1,064 households, out of which 33.0% had children under the age of 18 living with them, 46.3% were married couples living together, 15.7% had a female householder with no husband present, and 33.6% were non-families. 29.6% of all households were made up of individuals, and 12.9% had someone living alone who was 65 years of age or older. The average household size was 2.42 and the average family size was 3.01.

In the village, the population was spread out, with 27.4% under the age of 18, 9.1% from 18 to 24, 26.8% from 25 to 44, 22.6% from 45 to 64, and 14.1% who were 65 years of age or older. The median age was 36 years. For every 100 females there were 85.7 males. For every 100 females age 18 and over, there were 84.0 males.

The median income for a household in the village was $28,136, and the median income for a family was $35,690. Males had a median income of $29,673 versus $18,346 for females. The per capita income for the village was $13,270. About 10.9% of families and 15.2% of the population were below the poverty line, including 14.7% of those under age 18 and 18.5% of those age 65 or over.

Economy
Plastech operated a manufacturing plant in Byesville until late June 2008.

Education
Byesville is within the Rolling Hills School District.  Students attend Meadowbrook High School. Byesville has a public library, a branch of the Guernsey County Public Library.

Notable people
 Dom Capers, NFL defensive coordinator and head coach
 Herbert F. Christian, soldier, Awarded the Congressional Medal of Honor
 Dzvinia Orlowsky, poet, translator, editor and professor

See also
 Columbus and Ohio River Railroad

References

External links
 Byesville Branch Library
 Byesville Scenic Railway
 Byesville, Ohio website

Villages in Guernsey County, Ohio
Villages in Ohio
1856 establishments in Ohio
Populated places established in 1856